The Ivory Bangle Lady is a skeleton found in Sycamore Terrace, York in 1901. She was a high-status adult female, potentially of North African descent, who died in York in the 4th century AD. Her skeleton was found with bracelets, pendants, earrings, beads as well as a glass jug and mirror. She appears to have originally been from North Africa. A piece of bone inscribed with the words, "Hail, sister may you live in God" was found with her skeleton.

Skeletal remains
A 2010 research paper studied the skeletal remains of the Ivory Bangle Lady, which were found within a stone coffin. This research showed that the skeleton is of a young adult female, aged 18–23 years. Her height was calculated using regression analysis of her limb-bone length to be approximately 152–160 cm. Significantly, this research also used FORDISC to identified the Ivory Bangle Lady as having North African ancestry. This conclusion was reached following craniometric multivariate analyses, including measuring Mahalanobis distance, which suggested a strong affinity with two reference populations of African-American females from the 19th and 20th Centuries. Isotope analysis of oxygen and strontium isotopes suggest that she spent her childhood in the west of Britain or in coastal areas of Western Europe and the Mediterranean. However, a 2009 study found that FORDISC 3.0 "is only likely to be useful when an unidentified specimen is more or less complete and belongs to one of the populations represented in its reference samples", and even in such "favorable circumstances it can be expected to classify no more than 1 per cent of specimens with confidence."

Grave goods
The Ivory Bangle Lady was buried wearing ivory and jet bangles, a bracelet of blue glass beads, silver and bronze pendants, two yellow-glass earrings. A small, round glass mirror, a dark blue glass flagon, and an openwork, ivory inscription plaque were also included in the grave. The plaque reads SOROR AVE VIVAS IN DEO ("Hail sister, may you live in God"), which is evidence for a Christian population in late Roman York. Whilst the plaque is clearly Christian, the existence of other grave goods and the alignment of the grave in a north-south (rather than east-west) arrangement strongly suggests that the lady interred was pagan, but had connections with a Christian community rather than herself being a Christian.

Public display and reception
The skeleton and grave goods are on display together in the Yorkshire Museum. In the 1980s, the grave goods were on display as part of an exhibition titled "Roman Life at the Yorkshire Museum". It is currently on display in an exhibition title 'Roman York - Meet the People of the Empire'. The exhibition opened in August 2010 following the refurbishment of the Museum.

In 2012, the Ivory Bangle Lady was the focus of a pilot project by Heritage Sandbox which used Twitter to augment the exhibition with new content.

Reception
Immediately after the publication of this research and its discussion in the press the Ivory Bangle Lady became a focal point of a debate about immigration in the past, with public discussions focusing on her racial identity. Notably, the comments on the online publication of a Daily Mail article highlighted a backlash from readers. Emily Hanscam, in a 2019 article, compared this to the criticism aimed at Mary Beard in 2017 for defending the inclusion of a Black army officer in a BBC cartoon. On 22 October 2020 the Yorkshire Museum posted a blog post highlighting the biography of the Ivory Bangle Lady for Black History Month; this was targeted by alt-right groups who posted racist and negative comments in response to it. The Yorkshire Museum issued a statement on social media on 23 October condemning the attacks.

The biography of the Ivory Bangle Lady has been featured in several books and articles. She is featured in David Olusoga's 2017 book Black and British: A Forgotten History, as well a short film hosted by Olusoga and produced by the BBC, titled Alt History: Black British History We're Not Taught in Schools. She was featured in an online article by Vogue on '7 Remarkable black women who shaped British history', an article by The Guardian on 'Ten black history events that should be taught to every pupil', and was featured as the Museum 'Object of the Week' by the York Press in June 2020. The Ivory Bangle Lady was mentioned as a case study in a speech in the House of Commons on 8 September 2020 on the presence of black history in the current history curriculum by Theresa Villiers.

See also
Beachy Head Lady

References

External links
Audio except of Black and British: A Forgotten History, by David Olusoga, discussing the grave.

History of York
1901 in England
Collections of the Yorkshire Museum
4th-century women
Burials in North Yorkshire
Ancient Romans in Britain
Ivory
Women of African descent